For other people named Högne, see Haguna.

Högne was a king of Östergötland who appears in sources of Norse mythology.

Heimskringla
Snorri Sturluson wrote that he was the king of Östergötland and that he had a son named Hildur and daughter Hilda who was married to Granmar, the king of Södermanland. When Ingjald Ill-ruler murdered most of the sub-kings of Sweden, Högne and Granmar successfully defended their kingdoms. Snorri states that Högne and his son Hildur often made raids into the Swedish provinces killing many of Ingjald's men, and that he ruled his kingdom until he died.

Volsunga saga
In the Volsunga saga, the kings Högne and Granmar also appear, and in this saga, Högne has the sons Bragi and Dag, and a daughter Sigrun who he had promised to Granmar's son Hothbrodd. However, Sigrun has a suitor, Helgi Hundingsbane who attacks Granmar. Helgi kills both Högne, Bragi, Dag and Granmar's sons Hothbrodd, Gudmund and Starkad.

Kings in Norse mythology and legends
Kings of the Geats
Völsung cycle